Skee may refer to:

Skee, Sweden, a locality in Västra Götaland County, Sweden
DJ Skee (born 1983), American DJ
Skee Riegel (1914–2009), American golfer

People with the surname
Dylan Skee, English rugby league player